A House Divided is a 1913 American comedy short silent black and white film directed and produced by Alice Guy.

It was released in January 1985 by Channel 4 Television, devoted to the work of woman directors; and on 29 March 2019 at Diputación de Málaga for the International Women's Day.

Plot 
A husband and wife each come to suspect mistakenly that the other has been unfaithful.  Following a lawyer's advice, they agree to continue to live in the same house but without speaking to each other.  Eventually, the situation becomes unworkable and the couple reconcile.

Cast
 Fraunie Fraunholz as Gerald Hutton
 Marian Swayne as Diana Hutton

Reception 
The Moving Picture World gave the film a brief review, concluding that the film "will make some fun in some houses". The publication also summarized the plot prior to its release. Similarly, the plot was detailed by Moving Picture News in April, 1913.

References

External links
 
A House Divided on Turner Classic Movies
The film is available on YouTube

Silent American comedy films
1913 comedy films
1913 films
American comedy short films
American silent short films
1913 short films
American black-and-white films
Films directed by Alice Guy-Blaché
1910s American films